Lega Basket Serie A season steals leaders are the season by season steals leaders of the top-tier level professional basketball league in Italy, the LBA (first division), and the all-time stats leaders of both the LBA and the Serie A2 (2nd division).

Steals Leader by season
In basketball, steals occur when a player legally forced his opponent to commit a turnover by his positive and aggressive actions such as deflecting or catching the ball. The LBA's steals title is awarded to the player with the highest steals per game average in a given regular season. Prior to the 1987–88 season, the league's leader in steal was the player that scored the most total steals in the league during the season. Since the 1987–88 season, the steals' leader is the player with the highest steals average per game during the season.

By steals average

References

External links 
 LBA official website 

Lega Basket Serie A